Jazmine Jones (born October 15, 1996) is an American basketball player for the Washington Mystics of the WNBA. She played college basketball for the Louisville Cardinals of the Atlantic Coast Conference. She was drafted by the New York Liberty in the 2020 WNBA Draft.

High school career
Jones received a scholarship offer from Florida State in eighth grade. She attended Florida A&M University Developmental Research School and was coached by Ericka Cromartie. She was a two-time Florida state champion and was the 2016 Florida Gatorade Player of the Year. Jones finished her career with more than 2,000 points, 1,000 rebounds, 500 assists, and 500 steals. She committed to Louisville in her senior year.

College career
Jones played in a program-record 144 games at Louisville and contributed to a school-record 125 wins. She averaged 4.5 points and 2.6 rebounds per game as a freshman. Jones averaged 8.9 points per game as a sophomore and 7.6 points per game as a junior. As a senior, she averaged 14.1 points, 5.0 rebounds, 3.4 assists and 1.5 steals per game. She was selected to the All-ACC First Team, All-ACC Defensive Team and ACC All-Tournament Team and was also named a WBCA All-American honorable mention.

Professional career
Jones was selected with the 12th pick of the 2020 WNBA draft by the New York Liberty. She has also signed with the French team Tarbes Gespe Bigorre.

WNBA career statistics

Regular Season

|-
| align="left" | 2020
| align="left" | New York
| 20 || 2 || 21.4 || .404 || .333 || .788 || 4.1 || 2.3 || 1.4 || 0.5 || 2.9 || 10.8
|-
| align="left" | 2021
| align="left" | New York
| 27 || 0 || 16.6 || .356 || .383 || .761 || 2.4 || 1.1 || 0.5 || 0.4 || 1.6 || 5.9
|-
| align="left" | 2022
| align="left" | Connecticut
| 7 || 0 || 6.3 || .286 || .000 || .400 || 0.1 || 0.1 || 0.3 || 0.0 || 0.4 || 0.9 
|-
| align="left" | 2022
| align="left" | Washington
| 1 || 0 || 3.0 || .000 || .000 || .000 || 1.0 || 0.0 || 0.0 || 0.0 || 0.0 || 0.0 
|-
| align="left" | Career
| align="left" | 3 years, 3 teams
| 55 || 2 || 16.8 || .378 || .347 || .763 || 2.7 || 1.4 || 0.8 || 0.3 || 1.9 || 6.9

Postseason

|-
| align="left" | 2021
| align="left" | New York
| 1 || 0 || 3.0 || .000 || .000 || .000 || 0.0 || 0.0 || 0.0 || 0.0 || 0.0 || 0.0
|-
| align="left" | Career
| align="left" | 1 year, 1 team
| 1 || 0 || 3.0 || .000 || .000 || .000 || 0.0 || 0.0 || 0.0 || 0.0 || 0.0 || 0.0

Personal life
Jones is the daughter of Reginald and Felicia Jones. Her father played football at Florida A&M. Her brother Reginald, Jr. played football at Florida International University while sister GiGi played basketball at Appalachian State and Jacksonville.

References

External links
Louisville Cardinals bio

1996 births
Living people
American women's basketball players
Basketball players from Tallahassee, Florida
Louisville Cardinals women's basketball players
New York Liberty draft picks
New York Liberty players
Point guards
Shooting guards
Tarbes Gespe Bigorre players
American expatriate basketball people in France